The Unity Party of America is a national political party in the United States founded on November 4, 2004 with the slogan "Not Right, Not Left, But Forward!" The party is officially recognized by the State of Colorado and has members in 46 states.

History 
The Unity Party grew out of the grassroots group named Runners for Clark which supported General Wesley Clark's 2004 presidential campaign by raising campaign contributions and awareness of Clark's run for the presidency; Runners for Clark morphed into Unity Runners and then into the Unity Party.

Bill Hammons of Texas, New York and Colorado founded the Unity Party in 2004 as chairman and ran as the Unity Party of America candidate for Colorado's 2nd congressional district, centered on Boulder, in 2008 and again in 2010. By that point the Unity Party had expanded beyond Colorado to 27 states.  He then ran for U.S. senate in Colorado in 2014 before running for the senate again in 2016 and then for Colorado governor in 2018 (the "Unity" voter affiliation option in Colorado is a direct result of his Senate candidacy).

In 2012, veteran and Gold Star father Jim Pirtle of Colorado Springs declared as a Unity Party candidate for congress.

In June 2017, the Unity Party achieved full recognition as a minor party by the state of Colorado, and its candidates in the state no longer need to petition onto the ballot, but instead just need a "show of hands" at a party assembly.  By 2017, the party had spread to 37 states.

In September 2017, Unity Party members decided to begin referring to themselves as "Uniters."

In October 2018, Hammons was quoted as saying, "God did not ordain two parties in the United States," and went on to say one goal of his gubernatorial run was to help put a Unity Party Presidential candidate at the top of the ballot in Colorado in 2020.

In June 2019, Rebecca Keltie of Colorado Springs became the first female Unity Party candidate for the U.S. House of Representatives, and in September 2019 the Unity Party U.S. Senate candidacy of Arvada's Joshua Rodriguez created the first-ever contested Unity Party nomination race.

Bill Hammons and Eric Bodenstab were nominated for President and Vice President, respectively, in an online convention held over WebEx on April 4, 2020. Hammons and Bodenstab made it onto the ballot in Colorado, Louisiana and New Jersey.

Elections

2020 election 
Nominees Hammons and Bodenstab came in 12th place nationally in the 2020 United States Presidential election, winning 6,647 votes.

Downballot, the party's Senate candidate, Stephen "Seku" Evans, won 8,971 votes, coming in very last place, underperforming Hammons both in his senatorial run and in his 2018 gubernatorial run.

In the House of Representatives, the party only ran candidates in the state of Colorado, who averaged between 0.5% and 1% of the vote in their respective districts

The Unity Party's best performance came from James Triebert, who ran for Adams County Commissioner against Democrat Chad Tedesco. He won 29.1% of the vote, with 57,387 votes.

Ideology 
The Unity Party prides itself on acceptance, and its website openly admits this affinity to inclusiveness. To quote the homepage, "As members of the Unity Party, we focus on similarities rather than differences. We are non-partisan. We are a blending of diverse parties, political ideals, cultures, sexualities and genders, religions, spiritual practices, ethnicities, and socio-economic backgrounds. We welcome progressives, conservatives, outliers, non-conformists, and those from all political parties." Their belief is that exposing people to those with differing political mindsets mimic real-life scenarios, as opposed to interacting only with others who automatically follow the same ideals; the party hopes to inspire dialogue between individuals, brainstorming, and problem solving.

Platform 
As of 2014, the Unity Party platform was outlined as supporting a balanced budget amendment, an elimination of the federal income tax, a health care tax deduction, Social Security reform, term limits, and gerrymandering reform.

Presidential candidate performance

References

External links 

 Official website

2004 establishments in Colorado
Political parties in Colorado
Political parties in the United States